Meric Slover Gertler  is a Canadian academic, who is the 16th and current president of the University of Toronto since 2013. Previously, he served as dean of the Faculty of Arts and Science at the university from 2008 to 2013. Gertler is an urban theorist and geographer.

Life and career

Gertler was born in Edmonton, Alberta, Canada, and grew up in several cities in Southern Ontario. Gertler completed his undergraduate education at McMaster University, where he graduated summa cum laude in 1977. He received a Master of City Planning from the University of California, Berkeley in 1979 and a Doctorate of Philosophy from Harvard University in 1983. His dissertation was entitled Capital Dynamics and Regional Development.

Gertler joined the University of Toronto Department of Geography and Planning as a lecturer in 1983. He was promoted to Associate Professor in 1988 and full Professor in 1993, at which point he also received tenure.

Gertler's work focuses on the geography of innovative activity and the economies of city-regions. His work also examines the local nature of a globalized economy, focusing on manufacturing as embedded within local cultural norms, practice, and assumptions. Gertler's work examines the role of tacit knowledge and interactive learning in explaining local agglomeration economies and innovation. Gertler is the author, co-author or co-editor of more than 80 scholarly publications and seven books. These have had significant impact in his field and have led him to be one of Canada's most highly cited geographers.

Gertler has served as an advisor to local, regional and national governments in Canada, the United States and Europe, as well as to international agencies such as the Organisation for Economic Co-operation and Development and the European Union. He was the founding co-director of the Program on Globalization and Regional Innovation Systems (PROGRIS) at the Munk School of Global Affairs, served as director of the Department of Geography's Program in Planning and holds the Goldring Chair in Canadian Studies.

Gertler has held visiting appointments at institutions including the University of Oxford, University College London, the University of Oslo and the University of California, Los Angeles.

Awards and honours

Gertler has also been a Fellow of the Royal Society of Canada since 2003.

He received the 2014 Distinguished Alumni Award from the University of California, Berkeley and the 2014 Distinguished Scholarship Honor from the Association of American Geographers (AAG).

In May 2012, he was awarded an honorary Doctor of Philosophy degree from Sweden's Lund University, for his exceptional contributions to the fields of economic geography and regional development. In the same year, he was made an Academician of the Academy of Social Sciences (UK), becoming the first University of Toronto scholar inducted and one of only two Canadian members of the Academy.

He has been a Senior Fellow of the University of Toronto's Massey College since 2000.

A textbook co-edited by Gertler, the Oxford Handbook of Economic Geography received the Choice Magazine's "Outstanding Academic Book" award.

He won the 2007 Award for Scholarly Distinction from the Canadian Association of Geographers.

In December 2015, Gertler was awarded the Order of Canada with the grade of member.

He was elected as a Corresponding Fellow of the British Academy in 2015.

In March 2016, Gertler made the decision not to divest the University of Toronto from fossil fuels, which prompted a negative reaction from some students and faculty members.

References

External links
 New U of T President Son of Holocaust Survivor
 President’s Welcome

Selected publications
Gertler, M. S. 2004. Manufacturing Culture: the Institutional Geography of Industrial Practice. Oxford: Oxford University Press.
Gertler, M. S. 2003. A cultural economic geography of production: are we learning by doing? In The Handbook of Cultural Geography, eds. K. Anderson, M. Domosh, S. Pile and N. Thrift, 131-146. London: Sage.
Gertler, M. S. and D.A. Wolfe, eds. 2002. Innovation and Social Learning: Institutional Adaptation in an Era of Technological Change. Basingstoke, UK: Macmillan/Palgrave.
Rutherford, T. D. and M. S. Gertler. 2002. Labour in ‘lean’ times: geography, scale and the national trajectories of workplace change. Transactions, Institute of British Geographers NS27: 1-18.

Presidents of the University of Toronto
Academic staff of the University of Toronto
Economic geographers
Urban theorists
Harvard University alumni
Fellows of the Royal Society of Canada
Fellows of the Academy of Social Sciences
Living people
Members of the Order of Canada
McMaster University alumni
Corresponding Fellows of the British Academy
Year of birth missing (living people)